κ Hydrae, Latinised as Kappa Hydrae, is a solitary star in the equatorial constellation of Hydra. Its apparent visual magnitude is 5.06, which is bright enough to be faintly visible to the naked eye. It may be a variable star, meaning it undergoes repeated fluctuations in brightness by at least 0.1 magnitude.

This is an evolving B-type star with a stellar classification of B4 IV/V, having a luminosity class intermediate between a subgiant and a giant star. It has an estimated five times the mass of the Sun and 3.4 times the Sun's radius. Kappa Hydrae has a high rate of spin with a projected rotational velocity of 115.0 km/s, and is only about 31 million years old. The star radiates 328 times the solar luminosity from its outer atmosphere at an effective temperature of 16,150 K.

Name
This star was one of the set assigned by the 16th century astronomer Al Tizini to Al Sharāsīf (ألشراسيف), the Ribs (of Hydra), which included the stars from β Crateris westward through κ Hydrae.

According to the catalogue of stars in the Technical Memorandum 33-507 - A Reduced Star Catalog Containing 537 Named Stars, Al Sharāsīf were the title for two stars : β Crateris as Al Sharasīf II and κ Hydrae as Al Sharasīf I.

References

B-type main-sequence stars
B-type subgiants
Suspected variables
Hydra (constellation)
Hydrae, Kappa
Durchmusterung objects
Hydrae, 38
083754
047452
3849